The 1989 Paris–Roubaix was the 87th edition of the Paris–Roubaix cycle race and was held on 9 April 1989. The race started in Compiègne and finished in Roubaix. The race was won by Jean-Marie Wampers of the Panasonic team.

General classification

References

1989
1989 in road cycling
1989 in French sport
1989 UCI Road World Cup
April 1989 sports events in Europe